Antonio Bonsius (died 1533) was a Roman Catholic prelate who served as Bishop of Terracina, Priverno e Sezze (1528–1533).

Biography
On 3 January 1528, Antonio Bonsius was appointed during the papacy of Pope Clement VII as Bishop of Terracina, Priverno e Sezze.
He served as Bishop of Terracina, Priverno e Sezze until his death in 1533.

References

External links and additional sources
 (for Chronology of Bishops) 
 (for Chronology of Bishops) 

16th-century Italian Roman Catholic bishops
Bishops appointed by Pope Clement VII
1533 deaths